Jaiveer Shergill (born 28 June 1983) is a practicing lawyer in the Supreme Court of India and a politician. He is the National Spokesperson of the Bharatiya Janata Party since December 2022.

He was a member and Spokesperson of the Indian National Congress before quitting the party in August 2022.

Education and personal life
Jaiveer was born in Jalandhar, in Punjab state, to Rajeshwar Singh Shergill, a lawyer who specializes in cases relating to money laundering, and his wife Karamjeet Shergill. He studied at St. Jospeph's Boys School, Jalandhar, and APJ School, Jalandhar. He then enrolled in the West Bengal National University of Juridical Sciences (Kolkata), graduating in 2006 with a bachelor's degree in law. During his stint at the law school, Jaiveer participated in various extra-curricular activities, and was elected President of the Student Union. After practicing law for a few years in Delhi, Jaiveer went to the UC Berkeley School of Law, University of California, United States, and took a master's degree in Law.

Legal career
In 2006, after graduating from law school, Jaiveer enrolled in the Delhi Bar and began his career as a law associate with "Economic Laws Practice," a reputed law firm specializing in tax and commercial cases. In 2008, Jaiveer was accepted into the Chambers of Abhishek Singhvi, who is Senior Advocate, a Rajya Sabha MP, and a spokesman of the Indian National Congress party. As a practicing advocate at the Supreme Court of India, Jaiveer has been involved in various high-profile cases. He has been on the panel of lawyers representing Vodafone India in its celebrated case against the Income Tax department, (highest tax liability of US$2.2 billion), where the company refused to pay a tax demand of Rs. 2000 crore (US$330 million), insisting that the transaction of shares in an overseas tax haven, (Mauritius), had the effect of transferring (i.e. selling) all its assets in India from one party to another, with absolutely no tax liability in India on the sale, whether of sales tax or capital gains tax or any other tax.

Jaiveer has also represented one of the two sides in a controversial dispute regarding the offering of prayers at a site claimed by two religious communities in Karnataka state. Recently, Jaiveer represented the new airline venture Vistara, a joint venture of the Tata group and Singapore Airlines, in the Supreme Court and the Delhi High Court in a petition challenging the entry of foreign airlines into India. He also has a client base spanning India, Dubai, Australia and USA.

Political career
Served as the National Media Panelist for the Indian National Congress, Spokesperson of the Punjab Pradesh Congress and Co-Chairman of the Legal Cell, Congress (Punjab). As a unique initiative, Jaiveer launched a 24x7 legal toll-free helpline number to provide legal assistance to congress workers who are facing cases. Jaiveer has been instrumental in voicing various economic and social issues in the media including but not limited to foreign direct investment, depleted conditions of schools in Punjab, alarming drug use, women safety etc.

He is the youngest National Media Panelist of the Indian National Congress. He was also one of the youngest spokespersons of the Congress Party for Punjab (Punjab Pradesh Congress Committee) and also the youngest person to be appointed as the Co-Chairman of the Congress Legal Cell for Punjab. He has also served as the Young India Representative for the International Bar Association (the most prestigious Lawyers Organization of the world) for a period of two years (2008–09).

Jaiveer also regularly writes on issues of terrorism, parliamentary functioning, government policies relating to digital infrastructure, financial planning, employment generation, impacts of rampant drug use, governance etc. very recently, Jaiveer was invited, along with other policy makers from India, by the Government of United States of America for three-day dialogue at the North Atlantic Treaty Organization (NATO) headquarters in Brussels, Belgium to discuss security issues concerning India, Afghanistan and Pakistan.

He resigned from the Congress party on 24 August 2022 due to sycophancy in the party.

He joined BJP on 2 December 2022.

Awards

References

Supreme Court of India lawyers
1983 births
Living people
UC Berkeley School of Law alumni
People from Jalandhar
Bharatiya Janata Party politicians from Punjab
Indian National Congress politicians from Punjab, India